The following is a listing of the neighborhoods of Oakland, California, categorized into larger area designations of the city.

A broad geographical distinction in Oakland neighborhoods is between "the hills" and "the flatlands" (or "flats"). The more affluent neighborhoods are located in the hills along the northeast side of the city, while neighborhoods are generally less prosperous the nearer they are located to San Francisco Bay. Downtown and West Oakland are located entirely in the flatlands, while North and East Oakland incorporate lower hills and flatlands neighborhoods.  This hills/flatlands division extends beyond Oakland's borders into neighboring cities in the East Bay's urban core such as Berkeley, Hayward, San Leandro, and Richmond.

Central business district

 Chinatown
 City Center
 Civic Center
 Jack London District
 Jack London Square/Waterfront
 Lakeside Apartments District
 Northgate/Waverly

 Old Oakland
 Laney College
 Uptown

East Oakland 

Fruitvale
 Dimond District
 Laurel
 Allendale
 Peralta Hacienda

Middle East Oakland
 Havenscourt
 Lockwood Gardens
 Maxwell Park
 Melrose
 Millsmont
 Oakmore
 Ridgemont
 Seminary

San Antonio
 Lynn
 Tuxedo
 Reservoir Hill
 Cleveland Heights
 Bella Vista
 Highland Park
 Highland Terrace
 Meadow Brook
 Ivy Hill
 Clinton
 Rancho San Antonio
 Oak Tree
 Merritt
 East Peralta/Eastlake
 Jingletown

Elmhurst
 Brookfield Village
 Eastmont
 Sobrante Park
 Oak Knoll
 Columbia Gardens

Lake Merritt
"Lake Merritt" is used to refer to the lake itself, and to the residential neighborhoods and commercial districts in its vicinity.
 Adams Point
 Eastlake/Merritt
 Grand Lake (A portmanteau of Grand and Lakeshore Avenues)
 Lake Merritt (the body of water)
 Lakeside Apartments District
 Westlake/Oak Glen Park

North Oakland 

Broadway Auto Row
Bushrod
Golden Gate
Longfellow
Mosswood Park
Oak Glen Park/Richmond Boulevard
Piedmont (separate city surrounded by Oakland)
Piedmont Avenue
 Pill Hill
Rockridge
Santa Fe
Temescal

West Oakland 

 Acorn
 Cypress Village
 Dogtown
 Ghosttown
 Lower Bottoms 
 Oakland Point
 Port of Oakland

Oakland Hills 

Northeast Hills
Claremont
Montclair
Piedmont Pines
 Panoramic Hill
 Hiller Highlands
 Glen Highlands
 Merriwood
 Mountain View Cemetery
 Saint Mary Cemetery
 Forestland
 Shepherd Canyon
 Upper Rockridge
 Montclair Business District
 Oakmore
 Lake Temescal
 Joaquin Miller Park

Lower Hills District
 Crocker Highlands
 Glenview
 Lakeshore
 Lincoln Highlands
 Redwood Heights
 Trestle Glen
 Upper Dimond
 Upper Laurel

Southeast Hills
 Crestmont
 Grass Valley
 Sequoyah Heights
 Sheffield Village
 Skyline-Hillcrest Estates
 Caballo Hills
 Leona Heights
 Chabot Park
 Woodminster

References

Oakland
 
Neighborhoods